Oru Oorla is a 2014 Indian Tamil-language film directed by K. S. Vasanthakumar for producer P.Velusamy, starring Venkatesh, Neha Patil and Indrajit.

Plot
Theri, an alcoholic after his mother's death undergoes a change as his sister-in-law delivers a girl. He believes that his mother has reborn as his niece. He takes the responsibility of protecting her, but his brother's fight with a sex worker brings tragedy to all.

Cast

Venkatesh
Neha Patil
Indrajit
Annapoorni
Naan Kadavul Murali
Sundar
Siva
Iyyappan Kannan

Soundtrack 
The music composed by Ilaiyaraaja.

Review
The Times of India gave the film a rating of 2.5 out of 5 stars, praising it for its screenplay, performances, and music while also stating that the cinematography was not up to the mark.

References

External links
 

2014 films
2010s Tamil-language films
Films scored by Ilaiyaraaja